Angelo Gremo (3 December 1887 – 4 September 1940) was an Italian cyclist.

Palmares
Source:

1911
 1st Coppa Val di Taro
1912
 1st  National Road Race Championships
 2nd Overall Giro d'Italia
1913
 1st Giro della Romagna
 1st Grand Prix de Turin
1914
 1st Stage 1 Giro d'Italia
 2nd Gran Piemonte
 5th Giro dell'Emilia
 10th Il Lombardia
1915
 3rd Milan–San Remo
1917
 1st Milan-La Spezia
 1st Giro dell'Emilia
 3rd Milan–San Remo
 7th Il Lombardia
1919
 1st Milan–San Remo
 2nd National Road Race Championships
 3rd Gran Piemonte
 6th Overall Giro d'Italia
 9th Giro dell'Emilia
1920
 2nd Overall Giro d'Italia
1st Stage 8
 9th Gran Piemonte
1921
 1st Giro di Campania
 1st Giro della Provincia Milano (with Gaetano Belloni)
1st Stage 1 (with Gaetano Belloni)
 4th Gran Piemonte
 5th Overall Giro d'Italia
1922
 1st Giro del Piemonte
 6th Il Lombardia
1923
 3rd Gran Piemonte
 8th Milan–San Remo
 10th Overall Giro d'Italia
1924
 3rd Milano–Torino
 4th Gran Piemonte
 8th Giro dell'Emilia
1925
1st Giro della Romagna
1926
 8th Overall Giro d'Italia
 9th Overall Volta a Catalunya

Grand Tour general classification results timeline

References

1887 births
1940 deaths
Italian male cyclists
Cyclists from Turin
Italian Giro d'Italia stage winners